Walter Hörmann (born 13 September 1961) is a football coach and former player. As a player, he made 15 appearances for the Austria national team.

References

Honours
 Austrian Football Bundesliga: three times
 Austrian Cup: three times
 Austrian Supercup: three times

1961 births
Living people
Austrian footballers
Association football midfielders
Austria international footballers
SK Sturm Graz players
FC St. Gallen players
FK Austria Wien players
FC Red Bull Salzburg players
FC Kärnten players
Austrian football managers
FK Austria Wien managers
FC Vaduz managers
Liechtenstein national football team managers
FC Wil managers
SKN St. Pölten
TSV Hartberg managers
Austrian expatriate football managers
Austrian expatriate sportspeople in Liechtenstein
Expatriate football managers in Liechtenstein